Eleanor of England (also called Eleanor Plantagenet and Eleanor of Leicester) (1215 – 13 April 1275) was the youngest child of John, King of England and Isabella of Angoulême.

Early life
At the time of Eleanor's birth at Gloucester, King John's London was in the hands of French forces, John had been forced to sign Magna Carta and Queen Isabella was in shame. Eleanor never met her father, as he died at Newark Castle when she was barely a year old. The French, led by Prince Louis the Lion, the future Louis VIII, were marching through the south. The only lands loyal to her brother King Henry III of England were in the Midlands and southwest. The barons ruled the north, but they united with the royalists under William Marshal, 1st Earl of Pembroke, who protected the young king Henry, and Louis was defeated.

Before William Marshal died in 1219 Eleanor was promised to his son, also named William. They were married on 23 April 1224 at New Temple Church in London. The younger William was 34 and Eleanor only nine. He died in London on 6 April 1231, days before their seventh anniversary. There were no children of this marriage.

Eleanor had brought a dowry of 10 manors and 200 pounds per year to this marriage. According to the law of the time, widows were allowed to retain one third of the estates of the marriage. However, her brother-in-law Richard took all of the estates and sold many, including her dowry, to pay William's debts. Eleanor strove for many years to recover her lost property.

The widowed Eleanor swore a holy oath of chastity in the presence of Edmund Rich, Archbishop of Canterbury.

Simon de Montfort

Seven years later, she met Simon de Montfort, 6th Earl of Leicester. According to Matthew Paris, Simon was attracted to Eleanor's beauty and elegance as well as her wealth and high birth. They fell in love and married secretly on 7 January 1238 at the King's chapel in Westminster Palace. Her brother King Henry later alleged that he only allowed the marriage because Simon had seduced Eleanor. The marriage was controversial because of the oath Eleanor had sworn several years before to remain chaste. Because of this, Simon made a pilgrimage to Rome seeking papal approval for their union. Simon and Eleanor had seven children:
Henry de Montfort (November 1238 – 1265)
Simon de Montfort the Younger (April 1240 – 1271)
Amaury de Montfort (1242/1243–1300)
Guy de Montfort, Count of Nola (1244–1288)
Joanna, born and died in Bordeaux between 1248 and 1251
Richard de Montfort (1252–1281)
Eleanor de Montfort Princess of Wales (1258–1282)

During the Second Barons' War, Simon de Montfort's victory at the Battle of Lewes in 1264 led to him becoming de facto ruler of England. He tried to set up a reformed government, including the first parliament elected by citizens of the towns, but was unable to retain the support of the other barons. Several switched sides to the royalist cause; Montfort was defeated at the Battle of Evesham on 4 August 1265, where he was killed along with his son. Eleanor fled to exile in France where she became a nun at Montargis Abbey, a nunnery founded by her deceased husband's sister Amicia, who remained there as abbess. There she died on 13 April 1275, and was buried there. She was well treated by Henry, retained her incomes, and her proctors were allowed to pursue her litigation concerning the Leicester inheritance in the English courts; her will and testament were executed without hindrance.

Eleanor's daughter, Eleanor de Montfort, was married, at Worcester in 1278, to Llywelyn ap Gruffudd, Prince of Wales. She would die giving birth to their only child, Gwenllian of Wales. After the conquest of Wales, Gwenllian was imprisoned by Edward I of England, her mother's first cousin, at Sempringham priory, where she died 1337.

Fiction
Eleanor appears as a major character in Sharon Kay Penman's novel Falls the Shadow, where she is called Nell.

Eleanor is the main character in Virginia Henley's historical romance The Dragon and the Jewel, which tells of her life from just before her marriage to William Marshal to right before the Battle of Lewes in 1264. Her romance and marriage to Simon de Montfort are much romanticized in this novel, especially since in real life Simon is killed the year following the Battle of Lewes and the pair had already had all 7 of their children; in the book, Eleanor and Simon have only just had their first two sons. Eleanor makes a second appearance in Henley's The Marriage Prize. Her role in the book is that of the legal guardian to her niece, Rosamond Marshal.

Ancestors

Sources

Notes

1215 births
1275 deaths
13th-century English nuns
English princesses
Leicester
House of Plantagenet
Children of John, King of England
Daughters of kings